Alei Nao (born 9 December 1993) is a Papua New Guinean cricketer. He made his List A debut in the 2015–17 ICC World Cricket League Championship on 28 May 2016 against Kenya. He made his One Day International (ODI) debut on 31 March 2017 against the United Arab Emirates in the 2015–17 ICC World Cricket League Championship. He made his Twenty20 International (T20I) debut on 12 April 2017, also against the United Arab Emirates.

In August 2018, he was named in Papua New Guinea's squad for Group A of the 2018–19 ICC World Twenty20 East Asia-Pacific Qualifier tournament.

References

External links
 

1993 births
Living people
Papua New Guinean cricketers
Papua New Guinea One Day International cricketers
Papua New Guinea Twenty20 International cricketers
Place of birth missing (living people)